Kurukuru is a village located in Devarapalle, West Godavari district in the state of Andhra Pradesh, India. Nidadavole and Rajamundry railway station are the nearest railway stations.

Etymology 
In ancient times this village was named as "Kotthuru" (Kotthavuru people pronounce as kotthuru), later on renamed as Kurukuru.

Urbanisation 
When coming to

Demographics 
 Census of India, Kurukuru had a population of 1590. The total population constitutes 794 males and 797 females with a sex ratio of 1003 females per 1000 males. 162 children are in the age group of 0–6 years, with sex ratio of 862. The average literacy rate stands at 69.33%.

Temples 
Few things about the village there are 7 temples most people are devotional 
 Sri Subrahmanya Swami Temple
 Hanuman Temple
 Vinayaka Swami Temple
 Somalamma Temple
 Polayramma Temple
 Ramalayam Temple
 Sri Venkateswara Swami (Balaji) Temple

References 

Villages in West Godavari district